Reidsville is the name of two towns in the United States:
Reidsville, Georgia
Reidsville, North Carolina

See also
Reedsville (disambiguation)
Reidville (disambiguation)